Cranberry Marsh/Starratt Wildlife Management Area is a wildlife management area located just south of Valemount, British Columbia. It was established by the British Columbia Ministry of Forests, Lands, Natural Resource Operations and Rural Development (FLNRORD) on 28 March 2013 to protect Cranberry Marsh, a freshwater marsh that serves as an important breeding ground and stopover for a variety of migratory birds.

Description
Cranberry Marsh is the remnant of a flat bottom lake which now drains through the lower east slopes of the valley. Despite its natural appearance, the marsh has been greatly altered to improve the quality of the wetland habitat for migratory birds and resident species. The area also features a 5.5 km loop trail encircling the marsh and a small wooden tower for birding.

Ecology
The marsh features a patchwork of sedges and cattails among small stretches of open water. Strands of aspen and willow can be found along its shores. Resident mammal species include beaver, muskrat, and moose.

The marsh is located at the junction of the Columbian and Thompson-Okanagan bird migration corridors, which results in a variety migratory bird species using the marsh as a flyway stopover and a breeding ground. It also serves as a critical habitat for blue-listed American Bittern.

See also
Columbia National Wildlife Area

References

External links

Protected areas of British Columbia
Regional District of Fraser-Fort George
Wetlands of British Columbia